Julián David Arredondo Moreno (born 30 July 1988) is a Colombian former professional road cyclist, who rode professionally between 2012 and 2017 for the  and  teams. Arredondo is best known for winning the mountains classification at the 2014 Giro d'Italia, as well as the 2012–13 UCI Asia Tour standings. He also competed at the 2014 Vuelta a España and the 2015 Tour de France.

Major results

2006
 1st  Road race, National Junior Road Championships
2007
 1st Stage 1 Clásica Marinilla
2008
 10th GP Capodarco
2010
 1st GP Folignano — Trofeo Avis
 3rd GP Capodarco
2011
 5th Trofeo Internazionale Bastianelli
 5th Gran Premio San Giuseppe
 6th GP Capodarco
 9th Gran Premio Folignano
2012
 2nd Overall Tour of Japan
1st  Mountains classification
1st Stage 3
 2nd Overall Tour de Kumano
1st  Mountains classification
 4th Japan Cup
2013
 1st Overall UCI Asia Tour
 1st  Overall Tour de Langkawi
1st Stage 5
 1st  Overall Tour de Kumano
1st  Mountains classification
1st Stage 2
 2nd Overall Tour of Japan
1st  Young rider classification
 3rd Japan Cup
 10th Giro dell'Appennino
2014
 Giro d'Italia
1st  Mountains classification
1st Stage 18
 3rd Gran Premio Città di Camaiore
 4th Overall Tour de San Luis
1st Stages 2 & 6
 5th Overall Tirreno–Adriatico
 5th Japan Cup
 7th Overall Tour of Beijing
 8th Classic Sud-Ardèche
2015
 8th Overall Critérium International
 9th Overall Tour of Oman
2016
 10th Classic Sud-Ardèche

Grand Tour general classification results timeline

Other major stage races

References

External links
 

1988 births
Living people
Colombian male cyclists
People from Ciudad Bolívar
Colombian Giro d'Italia stage winners
Sportspeople from Antioquia Department
21st-century Colombian people